The 17th Asian Games Incheon 2014 Official Album is a compilation album that was released on 20 June 2014. It features songs written and selected for the 2014 Asian Games in Incheon.

Track listing

CD1
"We Are the Champions" (2011 Remaster) – Queen
"Moves like Jagger" – Maroon 5 featuring Christina Aguilera
"Applause" – Lady Gaga
"Roar" – Katy Perry
"We Are Golden" – Mika
"I Could Be the One" – Avicii vs. Nicky Romero
"Spectrum" – Zedd featuring Matthew Koma
"Burn" – Ellie Goulding
"Safe and Sound" – Capital Cities
"The Phoenix" – Fall Out Boy
"I Gotta Feeling" – The Black Eyed Peas
"Shine" – Take That
"Tubthumping" – Chumbawamba
"The Winner Takes It All" – ABBA
"Chariots of Fire" – Vangelis

CD2
"Hymm" – OCA
"Only One" (The Incheon Asiad song) – JYJ (South Korea)
"The Holy Sound of Love" – Sa Dingding (China)
"Hen Hen 狠狠" – Kary Ng (Hong Kong)
"Celebrate" – Apache Indian featuring Raghav (India)
"Victory" – Andra and The BackBone (Indonesia)
"Spending All My Time" – Perfume (Japan)
"Gemilang" – Ella (Malaysia)
"Paradise" – Sabrina (Philippines)
"Yi Qi Wo Wo 一起喔喔" – Sodagreen (Taiwan)
"Ter Mai Dai Yu Kon Deaw Bon Lok Nee" – King Pichet (Thailand)

Charts

References

2014 Asian Games
2014 compilation albums
Sports compilation albums
Universal Music Group compilation albums
Asian Games compilation albums